The Military Orbital Development System was created by the US Air Force Space System Division (SSD) in June 1962. It was to begin plans to use Gemini hardware as the first step in a new US Air Force man-in-space program called MODS (Manned Orbital Development System), a type of military space station that used Gemini spacecraft as ferry vehicles. The term Blue Gemini first appeared in August 1962 as part of a proposal to fly six Gemini missions with Air Force pilots in a preliminary orientation and training phase of MODS.  MODS was effectively superseded when the Manned Orbital Laboratory was announced in December 1963.

References

 NASA History Office on Blue Gemini

Human spaceflight programs
Project Gemini
Crewed spacecraft